The Mugello is a historic region and valley in northern Tuscany, in Italy, corresponding to the course of the River Sieve. It is located to the north of the city of Florence and includes the northernmost portion of the Metropolitan City of Florence. The Futa Pass connects the Mugello valley to the separate Santerno river valley.

History

The Mugello valley was settled by a Ligurian tribe known as the Magelli, hence the name. Then the region was occupied by the Etruscans who left many archaeological traces and who built the first road network of the Mugello.

The subsequent Ancient Roman conquest and colonization of the Mugello region dates back to the 4th century BCE. It is not only testified  by several finds such as tombs, coins, and walls, but also, through toponymy, e.g. names of places ending with the praedial suffix -ano (Latin -anus) or -ana: Cerliano, Figliano, Marcoiano, Galliano, Lucignano, etc.

In the Middle Ages the Mugello was home to numerous castles. The Mugello region was later acquired by the Republic of Florence. Several patrician families of the area built villas here, such as those of the Medici including Villa Medicea di Cafaggiolo and Villa Medicea del Trebbio.

In 1999 a dam was constructed across the Sieve river, forming the reservoir of Lake Bilancino in the Mugello valley.

In popular culture 

The Mugello gives its name to the Mugello Circuit, an automobile race track that hosts an annual Moto GP event, and to the Mugellese chicken, a bantam breed.

Towns 
Borgo San Lorenzo 
Scarperia 
Barberino di Mugello 
San Piero a Sieve 
Vicchio 
Dicomano 
San Godenzo
Palazzuolo sul Senio

See also

Firenzuola

Historical regions
Valleys of Tuscany
Metropolitan City of Florence
Geographical, historical and cultural regions of Italy